Cecil Lowry-Corry, 6th Earl Belmore (20 March 1873 – 2 March 1949) was the son of Somerset Lowry-Corry, 4th Earl Belmore and the brother of Armar Lowry-Corry, 5th Earl Belmore.

Educated at Wellington College he held the offices of justice of the peace for County Tyrone and County Fermanagh, deputy lieutenant of County Fermanagh, High Sheriff of County Tyrone (1916) and High Sheriff of County Fermanagh (1922). He was also chairman of Fermanagh County Council from 1943 and then of Enniskillen Rural District Council. He was also a member of the General Synod of the Church of Ireland and honorary secretary of the Clogher Diocesan Fund.

He succeeded to the title on 12 February 1948 on the death of his brother and died just over a year later aged 76. He was succeeded by his cousin.

External links
 

1873 births
1949 deaths
High Sheriffs of County Fermanagh
High Sheriffs of Tyrone
People educated at Wellington College, Berkshire
Deputy Lieutenants of Fermanagh
Irish Anglicans
Members of Fermanagh County Council
Cecil
Earls Belmore